

Gabon

Gambia

Georgia

Germany

Ghana

Greece

Guatemala

Guinea

Guinea-Bissau

Guyana

Haiti

Honduras

Hungary

Iceland

India

Indonesia

Iran

Iraq

Ireland

Israel

Italy

Jamaica

Japan

Jordan

Kazakhstan

Kenya

Korea, North 
Population figures from 2008 North Korea census.

Korea, South

Kosovo

Kuwait

Kyrgyzstan

See also 
 World largest cities

References 

2014 United Nations Demographic Yearbook (Table 8: Population of capital cities and cities of 100,000 or more inhabitants: latest available year, 1995 - 2014) United Nations Statistics Division, accessed 15 November 2016

Towns and cities with 100,000 or more inhabitants
100,000 or more inhabitants
G